The St. Regis River is an approximately  tributary of the Clark Fork of the Columbia River in Montana in the United States. It begins at Lookout Pass on the Idaho/Montana border, flowing east and ends at the confluence with the Clark Fork in the town of St. Regis.

See also

List of rivers of Montana
 Montana Stream Access Law

Notes

Rivers of Montana
Bodies of water of Mineral County, Montana